Juan García de Zéspedes (ca. 1619 – 5 August 1678) was a Mexican composer, singer, viol player, and teacher.

Biography
He is thought to have been born in Puebla, Mexico.  As a boy he was a soprano in the choir at Puebla Cathedral in 1630 under Juan Gutiérrez de Padilla. In 1664 he succeeded maestro Gutiérrez in an interim capacity. The title maestro became permanent in 1670. Although censured by the cathedral chapter more than once over disagreements as to his duties, he had a long career ended by his paralysis late in life.  He died in Puebla.

His musical compositions ranged from sacred pieces to secular pieces inspired by folk music.

Works
Convidando está la noche (on Youtube)
A la mar va mi Niña 
Plange quasi virgo plebs mea 
Salve regina
Guaracha: Ay Que Me Abraso

Bibliography
Renaissance and baroque musical sources in the Americas, R. Stevenson, 1970
Christmas Music from Baroque Mexico, R. Stevenson, 1974
Tesoro de la Música Polifónica en México, F. Ramírez, 1981

External links

1610s births
1678 deaths
Mexican Baroque composers
Mexican classical composers
Viol players
People from Puebla (city)
17th-century classical composers
Mexican male classical composers
17th-century male musicians